Cybermutt is a 2002 comic science fiction film that was made for Animal Planet as part of a trio of movies for the cable channel called "Animal Tales". Cybermutt is a fictional golden retriever.

Plot
The story centers on a young boy, Nino (Ryan Cooley), and his family dog, Rex, who takes on a significant role in Nino's life after the boy loses his father to cancer. During a stroll in the park with Nino and his mother, Rex manages to save the life of the eccentric inventor and dotcom wiz, Alex (Judd Nelson). Rex is badly injured during his act of heroism and Alex, as a gesture of gratitude, takes the dog back to his bionics lab to rebuild him. Through cutting edge gadgetry, Rex is imbued with super powers and becomes the target of villains determined to possess the new technology at any cost. After the procedure, Rex is capable of feats of great strength, can see in infrared vision and run at 70 mph.

Cast 
Judd Nelson – Alex 
Ryan Cooley – Nino 
Michelle Nolden – Juliet 
Paulina Mielech – Erica 
Tonio Arango – Temple 
Joe Pingue – Max 
Pedro Salvin – Rubio 
Khafre Armatrading – Kyle 
Bryon Bully – Bully #1 
Ian Bradley-Perrin – Bully #2

External links
 

2002 television films
2002 films
2000s science fiction comedy films
British comedy television films
Canadian comedy television films
English-language Canadian films
German television films
English-language German films
Films about dogs
Films directed by George T. Miller
2002 comedy films
2000s English-language films
2000s Canadian films